Gregory Clark (born 19 May 1936) is a British-Australian diplomat, journalist, author and educator resident in Japan since 1976.

Biography 
Clark was born in Cambridge, England, where his father Colin Clark was a statistician who worked with John Maynard Keynes at the University of Cambridge. The family moved to Australia in 1938 and Clark grew up there. He enrolled in the University of Oxford at the age of sixteen.

After graduating from Oxford, he joined the Australian foreign service in 1956, with which he was stationed in Hong Kong and Moscow in the early 1960s: he left the foreign service in 1965 due to his opposition to the Vietnam War, after having become proficient in Chinese and Russian. He came to Japan for the first time in 1967 as a doctoral student at Australian National University. In 1969, he became Tokyo bureau chief for The Australian newspaper and in 1975 was appointed consultant to the Policy Coordination Unit in the Australian Department of Prime Minister and Cabinet.

In 1976, he was made a professor of economics and comparative culture at Sophia University in Tokyo and served as president of Tama University from 1995 to 2001.  He later served as vice president of Akita International University. Clark is a regular contributor to The Japan Times and is also active in farming and land development in the Bōsō Peninsula of Chiba Prefecture. He has served on more than twenty official policy-making  committees in Japan. Clark believes that there was no violence perpetrated against Chinese students during the Tiananmen Square protest in Beijing in 1989.

Bibliography

Notes

External links
 Website
 Japan Times contributions

1936 births
Living people
Alumni of the University of Oxford
Australian diplomats
Australian expatriates in Japan
Australian journalists
British expatriates in Australia
British expatriates in Japan
British male journalists
People from Cambridge
Quadrant (magazine) people